John Lewis Brown (23 March 1921 – 10 January 1989) was an English professional footballer who played as a full-back in the Football League for York City, and in non-League football for Stanley United and York Civil Service.

References

1921 births
People from Crook, County Durham
Footballers from County Durham
1989 deaths
English footballers
Association football fullbacks
Stanley United F.C. players
York City F.C. players
English Football League players